The 2010 World Modern Pentathlon Championships were held in Chengdu, China from 1 to 7 to September 2010.

Medal summary

Men's events

Women's events

Mixed events

Medal table

See also
 World Modern Pentathlon Championship

References

External links
 Official website

Modern pentathlon in Asia
World Modern Pentathlon Championships
World Modern Pentathlon Championships
International sports competitions hosted by China
World Modern Pentathlon Championships